Harry Semels (November 20, 1887 – March 2, 1946)  was an American film actor. He appeared in over 315 film between 1917 and 1946.

Career
Semels appeared in his first film in 1917. He began to achieve fame after arriving at Columbia Pictures, appearing in several Three Stooges shorts including Disorder in the Court, Wee Wee Monsieur and Three Little Sew and Sews. He also appeared in feature films like Road to Morocco, The Princess and the Pirate and The Kid from Brooklyn. A versatile character actor, Semels often appeared as villains, waiters, soldiers, lawyers, et al.

Personal life
Semels was Jewish and had two children, Ruth and David, who was killed in action during World War II.

Death
 
Semels died of a heart attack on March 2, 1946, in Hollywood, California. He was 58 years old.

Selected filmography

Here Comes the Bride (1919)
A Fallen Idol (1919)
Bound and Gagged (1919)
The Black Secret (1919)
Pirate Gold (1920)
Rogues and Romance (1920)
The Phantom Foe (1920)
Velvet Fingers (1920)
The Sky Ranger (1921)
Hurricane Hutch (1921)
Speed (1922)
Plunder (1923)
Into the Net (1924)
The Heart of a Siren (1925)
Play Ball (1925)
Moran of the Mounted (1926)
 Stick to Your Story (1926)
The Demon (1926)
For Alimony Only (1926)
The House Without a Key (1926)
The Isle of Forgotten Women (1927)
On Guard (1927)
Hawk of the Hills (1927)
The Noose (1928)
The Yellow Cameo (1928)
Beware of Blondes (1928)
The Battle of the Sexes (1928)
Riley the Cop (1928)
The Tiger's Shadow (1928)
Out with the Tide (1928)
Virgin Lips (1928)
The Charge of the Gauchos (1928)
The Royal Rider (1929)
The Delightful Rogue (1929)
Those Who Dance (1930)
Women Everywhere (1930)
The Lion and the Lamb (1931)
Dishonored (1931)
Night Beat (1931)
Sally of the Subway (1932)
Sin's Pay Day (1932)
Vanity Street (1932)
South of the Rio Grande (1932)
Young Blood (1932)
 The Wyoming Whirlwind (1932)
Texas Buddies (1932)
Drum Taps (1933)
The Thrill Hunter (1933)
Damaged Lives (1933)
The Meanest Gal in Town (1934)
The Revenge Rider (1935)
Three Little Beers (1935)
I'll Name the Murderer (1936)
Movie Maniacs (1936)
Under Two Flags (1936)
Half Shot Shooters (1936)
Disorder in the Court (1936) - District Attorney (uncredited) 
The Gladiator (1938)
Wee Wee Monsieur (1938)
 The Marines Are Here (1938)
Three Little Sew and Sews (1939)
 Overland Mail (1939)
Dutiful But Dumb (1941)
 A Yank on the Burma Road (1942)
Back from the Front (1943)
Dizzy Pilots (1943)
 Sailor's Holiday (1944)
 The Unseen (1945) (uncredited rôle as Hurdy Gurdy Man)

References

External links

 
 

1887 births
1946 deaths
Male actors from New York City
American male film actors
Jewish American male actors
American male silent film actors
20th-century American male actors